The IMOCA 60 class yacht Temenos (2) was designed by Owen Clark Design and launched in September 2006 after being made by Southern Ocean Marine in New Zealand. The boat is a development of Ecover 2 and Aviva made by the same builder and designer and looks like the same moulds.

Racing results

References 

2000s sailing yachts
Sailing yachts designed by Owen Clarke Design
Sailing yachts designed by Merfyn Owen
Sailing yachts designed by Allen Clarke
Vendée Globe boats
IMOCA 60
Sailboat types built in New Zealand
Southern Ocean Marine